Anas ibn Naḍr (Arabic: ﺍﻧﺲ ﺑﻦ ﻧﻀﺮ) was one of the companions of the Islamic prophet Muhammad. He belonged to the Banu Khazraj tribe of the Ansar and was the uncle of Anas ibn Malik.  He could not join the Battle of Badr and was sad about it so he told the prophet,

He fought against the polytheists in the Battle of Uhud. In Sirat Ibn Hisham there is a narration from his time in this battle, where the polytheists said that the prophet Muhammad had died, and so he encountered companions who had stopped fighting, he told them then to stand and die for the sake that the prophet Muhammad had died, and was then martyred. His body was found with more than eighty wounds of swords and arrows. Only his sister could recognize his body by his fingers. Anas ibn Malik thought the following verse of Quran was revealed concerning him and other men of his sort:

References

Sahabah who participated in the battle of Uhud